The McNeese Cowboys and Cowgirls are composed of 14 teams representing McNeese State University in intercollegiate athletics, including men's and women's basketball, cross country, golf, and track and field. Men's sports include baseball and football. Women's sports include volleyball, tennis, soccer, and softball. The Cowboys and Cowgirls compete in NCAA Division I, with Cowboys football competing in the Football Championship Subdivision (FCS), and are members of the Southland Conference.

Sports sponsored

Baseball

The McNeese Cowboys baseball team represents McNeese State University in Lake Charles, Louisiana. The team is a member of the Southland Conference, which is part of the NCAA Division I. The team plays its home games at Joe Miller Ballpark.

Men's basketball

The McNeese Cowboys basketball team represents McNeese State University in Lake Charles, Louisiana. The school's team currently competes in the Southland Conference, which is part of the NCAA Division I. The team plays its home games at The Legacy Center (known before August 2021 as the Health and Human Performance Education Complex).

Women's basketball

The McNeese Cowgirls basketball team represents McNeese State University in Lake Charles, Louisiana. The school's team currently competes in the Southland Conference, which is part of the NCAA Division I. Like the Cowboys, the Cowgirls play home games at The Legacy Center.

Football

The McNeese Cowboys football team represents McNeese State University located in Lake Charles, Louisiana. The team competes in the Southland Conference, which is part of Division I FCS. The team plays its home games at Cowboy Stadium.

Softball

The McNeese Cowgirls softball team represents McNeese State University located in Lake Charles, Louisiana. The team competes in the Southland Conference, which is part of the NCAA Division I. The team plays its home games at Joe Miller Field at Cowboy Diamond.

See also
List of NCAA Division I institutions

References

External links
 

 
Sports teams in Lake Charles, Louisiana